Watts Hall was a building on the Ohio State University campus, in Columbus, Ohio, United States. The building was named after Arthur S. Watts, a former head of the Department of Ceramic Engineering, and former president of the American Ceramic Society. It housed the OSU Department of Materials Science and Engineering before being demolished in 2022 to make way for the second phase of the BMEC project.

History

Watts Hall was originally constructed in 1954 to house the Chemical Abstract Service of the American Chemical Society. In 1965, the CAS moved off of Ohio State's campus to a building on Dodridge Street. After the building was vacated, it was repurposed for the Department of Ceramic Engineering.

In November 2016, the courtyard adjacent to Watts Hall was the scene of a car ramming and stabbing attack that injured 10 people. Immediately after the attack, the perpetrator was fatally shot by an OSU police officer.

References

Demolished buildings and structures in Columbus, Ohio
Ohio State University
Buildings and structures demolished in 2022
1950s establishments in Ohio
2022 disestablishments in Ohio